Megachile funeraria is a species of bee in the family Megachilidae. It was described by Smith in 1863.

References

Funeraria
Insects described in 1863